Yohanes Rendy Sugiarto (born 16 August 1991) is an Indonesian badminton player from PB Djarum club. He was the boys' doubles gold medalist at the 2009 Asian Junior Badminton Championships partnered with Angga Pratama.

Achievements

Summer Universiade 
Men's doubles

BWF World Junior championships 
Boys' doubles

Asian Junior championships 
Boys' doubles

BWF Grand Prix 
The BWF Grand Prix had two levels, the Grand Prix and Grand Prix Gold. It was a series of badminton tournaments sanctioned by the Badminton World Federation (BWF) and played between 2007 and 2017.

Men's doubles

  BWF Grand Prix Gold tournament
  BWF Grand Prix tournament

BWF International Challenge/Series 
Men's doubles

  BWF International Challenge tournament
  BWF International Series tournament

References

External links 
 

1991 births
Living people
People from Banyumas Regency
Sportspeople from Central Java
Indonesian male badminton players
Universiade medalists in badminton
Universiade gold medalists for Indonesia
Universiade bronze medalists for Indonesia
Medalists at the 2011 Summer Universiade